Diaulos (Greek: Δίαυλος, English translation: "double pipe") was a double-stadion race, introduced in the 14th Olympiad of the ancient Olympic Games (724BC).

The length of each foot race varied depending on the length of the stadium. Scholars debate whether or not the runners had individual "turning" posts for the return leg of the race, or whether all the runners approached a common post, turned, and then raced back to the starting line. Although at Delphi an inscription referenced "turning-posts" as opposed to "turning-post", which suggests each runner had their own turning post, to prevent an outside runner from losing . These were called kampteres. Archaeological evidence at Nemea also shows that there were individual turning posts.

Notes

References 

 Miller, Stephen G., Ben Schmidt, Ancient Greek Athletics: the events at Olympia, Delphi, Nemea, and Isthmia. Yale University Press, 2004. 
 Golden, Mark. Sport in the Ancient World from A to Z. Routledge, 2003. 
 Gardiner, E. Norman. Athletics of the Ancient World. Oxford: Clarendon. Print. .
 Sweet, Waldo E. Sport and Recreation in Ancient Greece a Sourcebook with Translations. New York: Oxford UP, 1987. Print. .

Ancient Greek units of measurement
Ancient Olympic sports
Extinct sports